The 1992 500 km of Donington was the fourth race of the FIA Sportscar World Championship.  It was run on July 19, 1992

Official results

Class winners in bold.  Cars failing to complete 90% of winner's distance marked as Not Classified (NC).

Statistics
 Pole Position - #1 Peugeot Talbot Sport
 Fastest Lap - #2 Peugeot Talbot Sport
 Average Speed - 173.306 km/h

External links
 Official Results

500km Of Donington, 1992
6 Hours of Donington
Donington